The Pegasus EDA 100 Flamingo is a Slovenian ultralight aircraft, that was under development by Pegasus d.o.o. of Branik. The Flamingo was introduced to the public at the AERO Friedrichshafen show in 2010 and was first flown late in 2013. The aircraft was intended to be supplied as a complete ready-to-fly-aircraft and was initially expected to be distributed by Fly Synthesis in Europe.

The company seems to have gone out of business in early 2016 and development ended.

Design and development
The Flamingo was designed to comply with the Fédération Aéronautique Internationale microlight rules and intended as both a touring aircraft for private ownership and a trainer for flying school use. It features a cantilever low-wing, a two-seat tandem enclosed cockpit under a bubble canopy, fixed or optionally retractable tricycle landing gear and a single engine in tractor configuration.

The aircraft is made from carbon composites.

Variants
EDA 100 Flamingo Fixed Gear
Model with fixed landing gear, first flown in 2013.
EDA 100 Flamingo Retractable Gear
Model with retractable landing gear, not flown.

Specifications (EDA 100 Flamingo)

References

External links

 Official website
2010s Slovenian ultralight aircraft
Single-engined tractor aircraft